The 1887 Meath Football Championship was the first edition of the Meath GAA's premier inter-county Gaelic football tournament, for the 12 clubs that chose to participate. The final was played on Sunday 17 April 1887, with Dowdstown (later to become Walterstown) winning by 1-0 to 0-0 against Kells. Unlike later Meath Football Championships, there were no groups and it was an open draw.

Dowdstown, as county champions, went on to represent Meath in the 1887 All-Ireland Senior Football Championship, also the first All-Ireland Championship, but lost to Commercials of Limerick in the First Round.

Format
The 1887 championship was held as an open-draw knockout tournament.

Participating clubs
The clubs that chose to participate were:

Results
In 1887 point posts flanked the goalposts. A forfeit point was awarded to the opposition when a defender kicked the ball over his own end line. Forfeit points were counted when the scores were level at the end of the game. A forfeit point is represented as 0-0-1 (Goal-Point-Forfeit).

First round

Second round

Semi-final

Final

Kells objected to the result maintaining that the Dowdstown goal was unjustly scored. A subsequent County Committee meeting did not accept the objection. Kells submitted the dispute to the Central Executive. No record can be found of the result of this objection other than Dowdstown were eventually declared winners of the 1887 Meath Football Championship.

References

 First Meeting of Meath County Committee and Result of First Championship

External links

Meath Senior Football Championship
Meath Senior Football Championship